Nito might refer to:

People

Footballers
Nito (footballer, born 1933), real name Joaquín García Paredes, Spanish footballer
Nito (footballer, born 1934), real name Juan Álvarez Romero, Spanish footballer
Nito (footballer, born 1939), real name Fernando García Paredes, Spanish footballer
Ñito (born 1939), real name Cipriano Antonio González Rivero, Spanish footballer
Nito (footballer, born 1967), real name Adelino da Rocha Vieira, Portuguese footballer

Others
Nito Alves, Angolan politician
Nito Cortizo, Panamanian politician
Nito Mestre, Argentine musician
Nito Simonsen, Norwegian rower
Nito Gomes (born 2002), Bissau-Guinean footballer

Other
Nito (Maya site), historical trading post
Norwegian Society of Engineers and Technologists